Monoplex corrugatus is a species of predatory sea snail, a marine gastropod mollusk in the family Cymatiidae.

Description

This species has a large white shell with conical whorls provided with irregular knots. The mollusk is yellowish with red spots with white edges. The hairy and brown periostracum completely covers the shell.

Distribution and habitat
This species can be found from Bay of Biscay to Angola and in the Mediterranean sea. It lives on hard seabed at depths of 15 to 200 m.

References

External links
 International Fossil Sheel Museum
 Collection by José Santos
 Molluscos de Canarias

Cymatiidae
Gastropods described in 1816